A Donde Vas (English: Where Are You Going) is the ninth studio album recorded Mexican band by Los Bukis. It was released by Melody in 1985 (see 1985 in music). The album reached number one on the Billboard Regional Mexican Albums.

Track listing
All songs written and composed by Marco Antonio Solís except for Fijate, Fijate and Adios, Lo Siento

Credits and personnel
Marco Antonio Solís: Lead Vocals, Guitar
Joel Solís: Guitars, Backing Vocals
Roberto Guadarrama: Keyboards, Trumpet, Backing vocals
Eusebio "El Chivo" Cortez: Bass, Backing Vocals
Pedro Sánchez: Drums
Jose Javier Solis: Percussion, Backing Vocals
Jose Pepe Guadarrama: Backing Keyboards, Percussion

See also
List of number-one Billboard Regional Mexican Albums from the 1980s

References

External links
A Donde Vas on Amazon.com
[ A Donde Vas on Allmusic.com]

1985 albums
Los Bukis albums
Fonovisa Records albums